The 2006 NCAA Division III football season, part of the college football season organized by the NCAA at the Division III level in the United States, began in August 2006, and concluded with the NCAA Division III Football Championship, also known as the Stagg Bowl, in December 2006 at Salem Football Stadium in Salem, Virginia. The Mount Union Purple Raiders won their ninth Division III championship by defeating the Wisconsin–Whitewater Warhawks, 35−16. This was the second of seven straight championship games between Mount Union (3 wins) and Wisconsin–Whitewater (4 wins) and the second straight win for Mount Union.

The Gagliardi Trophy, given to the most outstanding player in Division III football, was awarded to Josh Brehm, quarterback from Alma.

Conference standings

Conference champions

Postseason
The 2006 NCAA Division III Football Championship playoffs were the 34th annual single-elimination tournament to determine the national champion of men's NCAA Division III college football. The championship Stagg Bowl game was held at Salem Football Stadium in Salem, Virginia for the 14th time.

Qualification
Twenty-one conferences met the requirements for an automatic ("Pool A") bid to the playoffs. Besides the NESCAC, which does not participate in the playoffs, five conferences had no Pool A bid. The NWC was in the first year and the PAC in the second year of the two-year waiting period, while the ACFC, UAA, and UMAC failed to meet the seven-member requirement.

Schools not in Pool A conferences were eligible for Pool B. The number of Pool B bids was determined by calculating the ratio of Pool A conferences to schools in those conferences and applying that ratio to the number of Pool B schools. The 21 Pool A conferences contained 181 schools, an average of 8.6 teams per conference. Thirty-seven schools were in Pool B, enough for four bids.

The remaining seven playoff spots were at-large ("Pool C") teams.

Playoff bracket

* Overtime

See also
2006 NCAA Division I FBS football season
2006 NCAA Division I FCS football season
2006 NCAA Division II football season

References